Ubaldo Matildo Fillol (born 21 July 1950), nicknamed el Pato (in English: "the Duck"), is an Argentine football coach and former goalkeeper. He took part in the 1974, 1978 (where he won the championship with his team and was voted Best Goalkeeper) and 1982 World Cups representing the Argentina national team. He also played in the South American qualifiers for the 1986 World Cup, but he was finally not chosen for the final team that played (and won) in Mexico. He is usually considered to be one of the greatest goalkeepers and usually regarded as the best Argentine goalkeeper ever.

Biography
Born in San Miguel del Monte, Fillol gave his first steps as goalkeeper in an amateur club of the city, where he spent four years. Former River Plate player and manager Renato Cesarini would be his mentor, after seeing him play at the regional league. In 1965 Fillol arrived to Quilmes A.C. to play at club's youth divisions. At the age of 18, Fillol debuted in Primera División (the Argentine top division) playing for Quilmes vs. Huracán, on 1 May 1969. He soon drew public attraction due to his agility and quick reflexes that allowed him to make acrobatic saves.

In the 1970 Metropolitano championship Fillol stopped the first penalty shoot in his career to Gimnasia y Esgrima LP forward Delio Onnis. That same year Quilmes would be relegated to Primera B, where Fillol played 23 matches with the club. In 1972 Fillol was hired by Racing Club de Avellaneda, debuting in the 1972 Metropolitano. In that championship, Fillol set a record of 6 penalty shot stopped, the highest in Argentine football for a same season.

In 1973 Fillol was traded to River Plate, where he would play the most part of his career. In River Plate, Fillol won seven titles, including the 1975 Metropolitano tournament that meant the first title for the club after 18 years with no championships. In 1977 Fillol was awarded the footballer of the Year of Argentina, being the first goalkeeper ever to receive the distinction.

He was called up for the Argentina national team, where he was part of the roster at the 1974 World Cup (the other goalkeepers were Daniel Carnevali and Miguel Ángel Santoro). Fillol's most notable performance with Argentina was in 1978, when he won the first Cup with the squad apart from being chosen as the best goalkeeper of the competition.

In 1983, after a conflict with the River Plate executives (during which he considered to retire from the activity) Fillol was transferred to Argentinos Juniors by request of Ángel Labruna (who was managing Argentinos Junior by then). Fillol played 17 matches there. In November that year, he moved to Brazil to play in Flamengo, where he won the Taça Guanabara with the club in 1984.

Fillol's debut in European football was in 1985 when he was traded to Atlético Madrid at 35. With Fillol as goalkeeper, the club won the Supercopa de España in 1985. In 1986 Fillol returned to Racing, where he won the first edition of the Supercopa Sudamericana in 1988, being also the first international title for the club after the 1967 Intercontinental Cup

At the age of 40, Fillol retired from football ending his career in Vélez Sarsfield in the last fixture of the 1990 Apertura championship, on 22 December 1990 at Estadio Monumental, with the visitor team beating local River Plate by 2–1. Fillol made an outstanding performance, even stopping a penalty shoot to forward Rubén da Silva. Fillol also held the record of 26 penalty stopped, the highest in Argentine football, sharing this record with Hugo Gatti.

After his retirement, Fillol served as goalkeeping coach in the Argentina national team, before being Racing Club manager in 2003. After a short tenure as Racing manager, Fillol returned to his role as goalkeeping coach for Argentina, also working at the 2006 FIFA World Cup. Nevertheless, Fillol left his charge when José Pekerman resigned as Argentina manager.

Fillol continued his career coaching goalkeepers in River Plate, but he resigned after a match v. San Lorenzo when Juan Pablo Carrizo refused to accept his gesture of support after a mistake that allowed rival team to score a goal. Fillol alleged he felt "humillated" by Carrizo and showed his desire to continue in the club but only working with youth players, as he had done before. Finally, Fillol would return to River Plate in 2014, serving as director of club's goalkeepers section.

Rivalry
For his River Plate career, he was the counterpart of Hugo Orlando Gatti, another great Argentine goalkeeper who played in the nemesis team, Boca Juniors. Fillol was always the image of professionalism and seriousness; "Madman" Gatti, on the other hand, looked eccentric, unorthodox.

Trivia
At the 1978 World Cup, Fillol wore the number 5 jersey, instead of 1 which is the standard for goalkeepers. This happened because Argentina, at that time, gave players their numbers alphabetically. The number 1 jersey was worn by offensive midfielder Norberto Alonso. For the same reason, Fillol wore the number 7 jersey at the 1982 tournament while Osvaldo Ardiles (another midfielder) wore the number 1. This practice was last permitted in 1986, when FIFA stated that the number 1 shirt should only be worn by goalkeepers.

Honours

Club

River Plate
Primera División (7): 1975 Metropolitano, 1975 Nacional, 1977 Metropolitano, 1979 Metropolitano, 1979 Nacional, 1980 Metropolitano, 1981 Nacional

Flamengo
 Taça Guanabara (1): 1984
 Taça Rio (1): 1985

Atlético Madrid
Supercopa de España (1): 1985

Racing Club
 Supercopa Libertadores (1): 1988

International
Argentina
 FIFA World Cup (1): 1978

Individual
 Footballer of the Year of Argentina: 1977
 FIFA World Cup All-Star Team: 1978
 Silver ball South American Player of the Year: 1978, 1983, 1984
 AFA Team of All Time (published 2015)

See also
Ubaldo Fillol Award

References

External links

 

Biography at planetworldcup.com
Biography

1950 births
Living people
Sportspeople from Buenos Aires Province
Argentine footballers
Argentinos Juniors footballers
Club Atlético River Plate footballers
Racing Club de Avellaneda footballers
Quilmes Atlético Club footballers
Club Atlético Vélez Sarsfield footballers
CR Flamengo footballers
La Liga players
Atlético Madrid footballers
Association football goalkeepers
FIFA World Cup-winning players
1974 FIFA World Cup players
1978 FIFA World Cup players
1982 FIFA World Cup players
1983 Copa América players
Argentina international footballers
Expatriate footballers in Brazil
Argentine beach soccer players
Argentine football managers
Racing Club de Avellaneda managers
Argentine Primera División players
Argentine expatriate footballers
Argentine people of French descent
Argentine expatriate sportspeople in Brazil
Argentine expatriate sportspeople in Spain